Sekolah Menengah Kebangsaan Sentosa (or SMK Sentosa) is a high school located in Taman Bandar Baru, Kampar, Perak, Malaysia. The school houses 576 students and 66 teachers.

History 
The school was built on what used to be a mining site.

Address 
Sekolah Menengah Kebangsaan Sentosa
Taman Bandar Baru 
31900, Kampar
Negeri Perak, Malaysia
Telefon =  6054671220
Fax       = 6054671221

References

External links 
 
 Facebook Sekolah Menengah Kebangsaan Sentosa

Kampar District
Publicly funded schools in Malaysia
Secondary schools in Malaysia